Katherine Towle Knox (October 7, 1874 – October 11, 1900) was a bicycle racer and the first African American to be accepted into the League of American Wheelmen (LAW).

Knox joined LAW in 1893 at a time when few women were members. The organization changed their constitution to only allow white members in 1894. In 1895 the organization clarified that constitutional changes are not retroactive and Knox's membership in the group was no longer questioned. Knox persisted in racing despite sometimes being denied access to races as well as service by restaurants and hotels while traveling. Knox was known both for her cycling ability, taking first place in a LAW meeting Waltham, Massachusetts, as well as her fashionable cycling outfits. Unlike her male counterparts of the time, much attention was given to her appearance and wardrobe. She was a strong rider, participating in and completing several century rides.

Personal life
Knox was born to Katherine Towle, a white woman from East Parsonfield, Maine who was a millworker, and John Knox a black man from Philadelphia who worked as a tailor. She was born in the neighborhood of East Cambridge in Cambridge, Massachusetts. Her family moved to Boston in the 1880s. Knox worked as a seamstress and dressmaker. She had one brother, Ernest Knox. She died in 1900 from kidney disease and was buried in Mount Auburn Cemetery in a public lot. A headstone was erected for her by family members on September 29, 2013.

Legacy 
In 2019, the City of Cambridge, Massachusetts named the Kittie Knox Bike Path after her. The path connects Broadway and Binney Street in Cambridge.

References

1874 births
1900 deaths
Burials at Mount Auburn Cemetery
American female cyclists
African-American sportswomen
Sportspeople from Cambridge, Massachusetts
Cyclists from Massachusetts